New Zealand has a unitary system of government in which the authority of the central government defines sub-national entities. Local government in New Zealand has only the powers conferred upon it by the New Zealand Parliament. In general, local authorities are responsible for enabling democratic local decision-making and promoting the social, economic, environmental, and cultural well-being of their communities, as well as more specific functions for which they have delegated authority.

, seventy-eight local authorities cover all areas of New Zealand. Local authorities are positioned within a two-tier structure of territorial authorities (district and city councils) and superimposed regional councils. In addition, district health boards are locally-elected bodies with responsibilities for oversight of health and disability services within a specified area, although these boards are not generally considered to be local authorities in the conventional sense.

History

The model of local government introduced after New Zealand became a British colony in 1840 had nothing in common with the tribal system practised by Māori. The New Zealand Constitution Act 1852, a British Act of Parliament, established six provinces in New Zealand—Auckland, New Plymouth (later to be renamed Taranaki), Wellington, Nelson, Canterbury, and Otago—based on the six original planned settlements. These provinces were largely autonomous; each had an elected council and an elected chief official, called a superintendent. The New Provinces Act 1858 allowed for the creation of Hawke's Bay, Marlborough, Southland (abolished 1870) and Westland provinces, established between 1858 and 1873.

The Constitution Act also allowed the creation of municipal corporations, or local governments, within provinces. Municipal corporations could be overruled by the province in which they were located. One of the first municipal corporations established was the Wellington City Corporation, created in 1870.

The provinces were abolished in 1876 so that government could be centralised, for financial reasons. Provincial councils were dependent on central government for revenue, and all except Otago and Canterbury were in financial difficulties at the time of their abolition. Since then, Parliament has been the single and supreme source of power—local authorities are created by Parliament, can be abolished by it, and are responsible for discharging functions assigned by it. The former provinces are remembered in regional public holidays and sporting rivalries.

From 1876 onwards, councils have had distributed functions, which vary locally. A system of counties similar to other countries' systems was instituted and persisted with few changes (except for mergers and other localised boundary adjustments) until 1989, when the Fourth Labour Government set about comprehensively reorganising the local government system by implementing the current two-tier structure of regions and territorial authorities, and reduced the number of local bodies from approximately 850 to 86.

Auckland Council is the newest local authority. It was created on 1 November 2010 following a three-year process that began with the Royal Commission on Auckland Governance. Picking up on one of the Royal Commission's recommendations, the Fifth National Government combined the functions of the existing Auckland Regional Council and the region's seven previous city and district councils into one "super-city". Since then, the Local Government Commission has had a role considering changes to New Zealand's local government structure. Further amalgamations (of the councils in the Nelson–Tasman region, the Hawkes' Bay region, the Wellington region, the three Wairarapa districts, and the West Coast region) have been mooted but did not receive sufficient public support to progress further. Applications for secession from Auckland Council for the North Rodney and Waiheke Island communities have also failed.

Legislative framework 
The New Zealand Government (by introducing bills, promulgating regulations and recommending Orders in Council) and the New Zealand House of Representatives (by enacting legislation) determine the overarching structure and delegated functions of local government. The general principle is that local government in New Zealand may only do what it is specifically authorised to do, and may not do anything that it is not authorised to do.

The following is a list of key local government statutes.

 The Local Government Act 2002 is one of the primary pieces of legislation for the sector, along with the Local Government Act 1974 (much of which is repealed). It provides for the purpose of local government and key functions including the council's governance and service provision responsibilities, strategic and financial planning requirements, and consultation procedures.
 The Resource Management Act 1991 (the RMA) has replaced the Town and Country Planning Act 1977 as the main local government planning legislation. The RMA also includes environmental protection laws.
 The Local Government (Rating) Act 2002 empowers local authorities to finance themselves by collecting property taxes. 
 The Local Government Official Information and Meetings Act 1987 provides for the public right of access to council-held information, and for council decisions to be made in public meetings. 
 Elections and local referendums are held in accordance with the Local Electoral Act 2001. 
 Other responsibilities are prescribed under specific statutes such as the Sale and Supply of Alcohol Act 2012 and the Dog Control Act 2000.

Legislation conferring responsibilities on one or several local authorities may be passed from time to time (such as the Wellington Town Belt Act 2016).

Purpose 
As defined in the Local Government Act 2002, the purpose of local government is:
 to enable democratic local decision-making and action by, and on behalf of, communities; and
 to promote the social, economic, environmental, and cultural well-being of communities in the present and for the future.
Between 2013 and 2019, the second purpose statement was, instead, "to meet the current and future needs of communities for good-quality local infrastructure, local public services and performance of regulatory functions in a way that is most cost-effective for households and businesses."

Oversight and accountability 
Local authorities are functionally independent but are subject to audit requirements (for example, of their financial statements and plans) through Audit New Zealand under the authority of the controller and auditor-general. In addition, the Department of Internal Affairs carries out some monitoring functions on behalf of the minister of local government, who has a range of intervention functions that the minister may exercise in response to a poor-performing council. For example, the minister may appoint a Crown observer or, in extreme situations, remove the elected members and appoint commissioners. However, the primary way that local authority elected members are held accountable is through the triennial local elections.

Structure 

New Zealand has two tiers of local government. The top tier consists of regional councils, of which there are eleven. Regional councils are responsible for activities such as environmental and public transport planning. The second tier consists of territorial authorities, of which there are sixty-seven: thirteen city councils, fifty-three district councils and Chatham Islands Council. Territorial authorities manage the most direct local public services, such as water supply and sanitation, road infrastructure, and museums and libraries. Together, regional and territorial authorities are called local authorities.

Five territorial authorities (Auckland Council, Gisborne District Council, Nelson City Council, Tasman District Council and Marlborough District Council) are unitary authorities, meaning they perform the functions of a regional council in addition to those of a territorial authority. The local authority for the outlying Chatham Islands has its own legislation (the Chatham Islands Council Act 1995, which replaced the Chatham Islands County Council Empowering Act 1980) and has unique powers similar to those of a unitary authority.

Most territorial authorities are wholly within one region, but six districts (Rotorua Lakes, Taupō, Stratford, Rangitikei, Tararua and Waitaki) fall within two or more regions. There is no formal reporting relationship between a regional council and the territorial authorities in its region, but they work together on some matters including civil defence and regional planning. The Local Government Act 2002 provides for the establishment of joint committees of multiple territorial authorities for these purposes.

The external boundaries of a local authority can be changed by an Order in Council or through notice in the New Zealand Gazette. Several outlying islands do not fall within the jurisdiction of any territorial authority; for those islands, the Minister of Local Government acts as the territorial authority. The Department of Internal Affairs provides administration on behalf of the minister.

Governance and management 
Each elected council is responsible for the local authority's governance and employs a chief executive, who is responsible for its management. The chief executive's role, outlined in the Local Government Act 2002, is to advise the council and implement its decisions, as well as employing staff and ensuring that all of a council's legal responsibilities are attended to. The term of a chief executive's employment is for up to five years, which may be extended to a maximum of seven years. Much of the governance and regulatory responsibilities of councils are transacted by committees or by the chief executive's staff, under delegation from the full council, although the level of delegation varies between councils. Councils may also choose to establish and delegate functions to companies or trusts (known as council-controlled organisations or council-controlled trading organisations when the local authority has the majority interest).

Regional councils and territorial authorities have different statutory responsibilities from one another, as well as other key differences in terms of their governance structures.

Regions 

There are eleven regional councils and five unitary authorities. Regional council duties include:
 environmental management, particularly air and water quality and catchment control under the Resource Management Act 1991.
 regional aspects of civil defence.
 transportation planning and contracting of subsidised public passenger transport.
Regional councils are funded through rates, subsidies from central government, income from trading, and user charges for certain public services. Councils set their own levels of rates, though the mechanism for collecting it usually involves channelling through the territorial authority collection system.

Cities and districts

The territorial authorities consist of thirteen city councils, fifty-three district councils and one special council for the Chatham Islands. A city is defined in the Local Government Act 2002 as an urban area with 50,000 residents. A district council serves a combination of rural and urban communities. Councillors are either elected through wards or at large. An additional member is the mayor, who is elected at large and chairs the council. Like regional councils, they too set their own levels of rates. Territorial authorities manage the most direct government services, such as water supply and sanitation, local transport infrastructure, the approval of building consents, public health, and libraries, museums and recreational facilities. While Parliament sets the roles of local government in legislation, the level and type of services supplied are determined locally in public meetings.

Community boards 

Territorial authorities may establish and delegate powers to community boards. The boundaries of community boards may be reviewed before each triennial local government election; this is provided for in the Local Electoral Act 2001. These boards, instituted at the behest of either local citizens or territorial authorities, advocate community views but cannot levy taxes, appoint staff, or own property. Auckland Council has, and other unitary authorities may (but do not yet) have, a system of local boards, which have a different set of responsibilities and accountabilities to community boards.

District health boards

New Zealand's health sector was restructured several times during the 20th century. The most recent restructuring occurred in 2001, with new legislation creating twenty-one district health boards (DHBs). These boards are responsible for the oversight of health and disability services within their communities. Elections for seven members of each district health board are held alongside elections for territorial and regional authorities. These members are directly elected by residents of their area, at-large (except for the Southern District Health Board, which draws its members from two constituencies), using the single transferable vote system. In addition, the Minister of Health may appoint up to four members. The Minister of Health also assigns who will be the chair and deputy chair of the board. There are currently twenty DHBs. The Minister has power to replace a Board considered to be performing poorly; Commissioners have been appointed on three occasions.

In April 2021, the Sixth Labour Government announced that the system of district health boards will be abolished and replaced by a single agency to be called Health New Zealand. In addition, a new Māori Health Authority will be set up to regulate and provide health services to the Māori community.

Three Waters reform programme

Water supply and sanitation in New Zealand is provided for most people by infrastructure owned by territorial authorities including city councils in urban areas and district councils in rural areas. As at 2021, there are 67 different asset-owning organisations.

Central government is developing a major programme of nationwide reform  with the aim of rationalising the provision of services for three waters. It is proposed that a small number of large publicly owned entities will be established to own and manage the three waters assets across the country. The reforms include complete separation of asset ownership from the existing territorial authorities. The nationwide reform programme is being developed in partnership with local government and iwi/Māori as the Crown’s Treaty partner.

Charges for water services typically represent around 40% of a rates bill in an urban area. In a submission on the Local Government Act 2002 Amendment Bill 2016, the Hauraki District Council made the following comments about the sustainability of local authorities if the revenue associated with water and transport were transferred to other bodies:

In late October 2021, Local Government Minister Nanaia Mahuta unveiled the Government's "Three Waters reform programme". The proposals envisaged taking the administration of New Zealand's storm-water, drinking-water and wastewater from existing local councils and existing territorial bodies and transferring these tasks to new local-government authorities. These proposed reforms would transfer management of water services and assets to the control of four new water entities by July 2024. These entities would be managed by independent boards jointly elected by a group set up by councils and by Māori iwi (tribes). 

The Government's proposed Three Water reforms were criticised by several local council leaders including Mayor of Auckland Phil Goff, Mayor of Christchurch Lianne Dalziel, Mayor of Hastings Sandra Hazlehurst, Mayor of the Far North District John Carter, Mayor of Dunedin Aaron Hawkins, and Mayor of Wellington Andy Foster for taking these water utilities and services out of their control. In addition, the opposition National and ACT parties have vowed to repeal the Three Waters reforms if elected into government. By contrast, Ngāi Tahu's Dr Te Maire Tau, the co-chair of Te Kura Taka Pini (the tribe's freshwater group) welcomed the Three Water reforms, claiming they would improve water services and environmental outcomes.

Elections 

Each of the regions and territorial authorities is governed by a council, which is directly elected by the residents of that region, district or city every three years in October. The Local Electoral Act 2001 sets out the common framework for election management and permits, to some extent, for each council to determine its own electoral arrangements. Councils may choose their own:

 voting method (either paper-based booth voting or all-postal voting);
 electoral system (either first-past-the-post voting or the single transferable vote);
 the number of members on the council, excluding the mayor (between 6 and 29, except for Auckland Council which is fixed at 20);
 whether those councillors are elected at-large or through a system of wards (and decide the boundaries for those wards);
 whether the district will have dedicated Māori representation; and 
 the order of names on the voting document.

At the regional council level, wards are known as constituencies. Because of the geographic and populational size of regional councils there is a legislative requirement for each regional council to have at least two constituencies. Other than Auckland Council, territorial authorities may also choose whether or not to establish one or more community boards, which form the lowest and weakest arm of local government.

Electors of territorial authorities directly elect their city or district's own mayor, alongside local councillors and (if established prior to the elections) community board members. Regional councils do not have a directly-elected mayor; instead, a chairperson is chosen from within the ranks of the elected councillors by the council at its first meeting following the elections.

Due to the primary revenue stream of many territorial authorities being property taxes (rates), electors are entitled to register and vote in the local elections of cities, districts and regions where they pay rates but do not reside. About 12,700 such ratepayer votes were cast in 2016.

Ward/constituency establishment and boundary decisions
Every six years, the Local Electoral Act 2001 requires councils to review their representation arrangements. Unlike for the boundaries of parliamentary electorates, which are determined by an independent commission, councils make their own representation decisions. In the year prior to an election, the outgoing council may determine the number of members it has after its next election, and whether those members are elected by wards/constituencies or at large. The council may also consider whether to establish (or disestablish) community boards. Councils are required to give consideration to "fair and effective representation" when making their decisions. Appeals on council decisions for general representation arrangements may be appealed to the Local Government Commission. If a council's decision does not meet the statutory definitions of fair and effective representation then it is automatically appealed.

Māori representation 

Māori wards and constituencies are wards and constituencies on local government and regional bodies that represent local constituents registered on the Māori parliamentary electoral roll vote. Like Māori electorates within the New Zealand Parliament, their purpose is to ensure that Māori are represented in the local government policy process. Māori wards and constituencies have been a polarising issue in New Zealand politics. While the Labour, Green, and Māori parties have supported Māori wards and constituencies in order to boost Māori participation in the political process, they have been opposed by the center-right National Party, the populist New Zealand First Party, and the libertarian ACT Party on the grounds that they promote ethnic division and alleged separatism.

Māori wards and constituencies were first introduced by the Bay of Plenty Regional Council in 2001. Efforts to introduce them to other local and regional government bodies in New Zealand were complicated by a poll provision allowing referendums on the issue of introducing Māori wards and constituencies.  As a result, attempts to introduce Māori wards and constituencies were defeated at several polls in New Plymouth, Palmerston North, the Western Bay of Plenty, Whakatāne, Manawatu, and Kaikōura.

In late February 2021, the Sixth Labour Government passed the Local Electoral (Māori Wards and Māori Constituencies) Amendment Act 2021, which eliminated the poll provision for establishing Māori wards and constituencies.

Remuneration 
Under the Remuneration Authority Act 1977 and clauses 6 and 7A of Schedule 7 of the Local Government Act 2002, pay rates for members of local bodies are set each year by the Remuneration Authority. In 2021 the annual salary scales ranged from $296,000 for the Mayor of Auckland to $2,030 for members of several community boards.

In the 1895 Local Government Bill, which failed to pass, it was proposed council chairmen should be paid £400 a year. Section 15 of the Local Bodies' Proceedings and Powers Act 1953 allowed up to £750 (in 2022 equivalent to about $48,000) for Mayors of Auckland, Wellington, Christchurch and Dunedin and £500 for the chairmen of counties.

See also

Local Government New Zealand, represents the interests of local government bodies
New Zealand Local Government, a monthly trade magazine published since 1964
New Zealand local government and human rights
Realm of New Zealand, including associated states and dependencies
New Zealand outlying islands
Local Government Act 1974
Local Government Act 2002
Local elections in New Zealand

References

External links
Local Councils – Official website (maintained by the Department of Internal Affairs)
Envirolink – a regional council driven funding scheme
Relevant legislation – legislation.govt.nz

 
Politics of New Zealand